Nicholas Halm-Lutterodt, better known as Paa Nii Lutterodt (1937/38 – 18 July 2006) is a former Ghanaian international football player. He was nicknamed "The Fox".

He won the 1965 Africa Cup of Nations title with Ghana, and scored in the group match against Ivory Coast.

He died after a short illness in the Beth Israel Medical Center in Newark, New Jersey. He was buried in Osu, Ghana.

References

1937 births
2006 deaths
Association football defenders
Ghanaian footballers
Ghana international footballers
1965 African Cup of Nations players
Africa Cup of Nations-winning players
Asante Kotoko S.C. players